The American Hairless Terrier is a breed of companion dog from the United States that was developed from naturally hairless Rat Terriers.

History
In 1972, a completely hairless bitch pup was whelped in a litter of purebred Rat Terriers owned by Willie and Edwin Scott of Louisiana. Named Josephine, the bitch conformed to the Rat Terrier type in every way except for her coat, so the Scotts bred from her and her first litter produced another hairless bitch pup, Gypsy. Neither bitch whelped another hairless pup in multiple litters until, in 1981 at the age of nine, Josephine produced two more hairless pups, a dog and a bitch. In 1983 the dog, Snoopy, was mated to his hairless sisters and many more hairless pups were whelped, establishing the foundation stock for the new breed. Originally registered as a hairless variety of Rat Terriers, eventually the Scotts adopted a different breed name for their unique line and established a separate breed club, the American Hairless Terrier Association. In 2004 the United Kennel Club recognised the line as a breed and in 2016 the American Kennel Club also recognised the breed.

Description
The breed has pricked ears and can be born with either a naturally short tail or a long tail that is never docked.

At birth American Hairless Terriers are born with a light fuzz of hair over their entire body which they gradually shed from the nose backwards until they are entirely naked, this typically occurs by the age of six weeks; they retain eyebrows and whiskers. The breed standard states hairless examples’ skin can be any color, although they are usually part colored with freckles that enlarge with age. Because of their lack of hair, the breed is particularly susceptible to hypothermia in cold weather as well as sunburn in sunny conditions.

Some American Hairless Terriers are whelped with coats; they are still recognised as examples of the breed. The breed standard states coated examples of the breed have a short and dense coat that can be solid white or bi-color, tri-color, sable and brindle, always with some white.

See also
 Dogs portal
 List of dog breeds
 Feist

References

Terriers
Hairless dogs
Dog breeds originating in the United States
Companion dogs